Mihai Dina (born 15 September 1985) is a Romanian footballer who played as a midfielder.

References

External links
 
 Mihai Dina at Footballdatabase

1985 births
Living people
Sportspeople from Craiova
Romanian footballers
Association football midfielders
FC U Craiova 1948 players
CS Mioveni players
FC Petrolul Ploiești players
Győri ETO FC players
ACS Poli Timișoara players
Aris Limassol FC players
CS Concordia Chiajna players
AEL Limassol players
SCM Râmnicu Vâlcea players
CS Sportul Snagov players
Othellos Athienou F.C. players
Liga I players
Liga II players
Nemzeti Bajnokság I players
Cypriot First Division players
Cypriot Second Division players
Romanian expatriate footballers
Expatriate footballers in Hungary
Romanian expatriate sportspeople in Hungary
Expatriate footballers in Cyprus
Romanian expatriate sportspeople in Cyprus